The Sarasota Journal was an American daily newspaper published in Sarasota, Florida, from 1952 until 1982. The Journal was founded in 1952 by publisher Lindsay Newspapers Inc. as an afternoon companion to their morning daily Sarasota Herald-Tribune newspaper.

Citing steadily declining circulation figures, Lindsay Newspapers shut down the Journal just before a sale of the larger Herald-Tribune to the New York Times Company in late 1982 for an estimated $87 million.  The final circulation figure for the Journal was 5,337, about one-third of the paper's reach in the early 1960s.

The paper's last date of publication was July 9, 1982.

References

1952 establishments in Florida
1982 disestablishments in Florida
Defunct newspapers published in Florida
Newspapers established in 1952
Publications disestablished in 1982